Dr. Rubel Shelly is an author, minister, and professor at Lipscomb University. He is the former president of Rochester University .

Life
Shelly began as an instructor in the department of Religion and Philosophy at Freed-Hardeman University in 1975. In 1978, Shelly began preaching as Senior Minister for the Family of God at Woodmont Hills, formerly known as the Woodmont Hills Church of Christ, in Nashville, Tennessee where he continued until 2005. While preaching at Woodmont Hills, he also taught at Lipscomb University, Vanderbilt University School of Medicine, and Tennessee State University. From 1979 to 1980 while he worked to complete his graduate work at Vanderbilt University, he served as a graduate assistant in the Department of Philosophy. From 1981 to 1983, he was an Assistant Professor of Philosophy at Lipscomb University.  In 1986, while continuing his education at Vanderbilt University, he taught as an Adjunct Assistant Professor in the Department of Medicine (Medical Ethics) until 1988. From 2000 to 2004, he was an Adjunct Assistant Professor of Philosophy at Tennessee State University.

When he stepped down from the pulpit in 2005, he began teaching again as a Professor of Philosophy and Religion at Rochester University, in Rochester Hills, Michigan. He was named the President of Rochester University in May 2009. He also served as a co-minister for the Bristol Road Church of Christ in Flint, Michigan. In late 2012, Shelly announced that he would be stepping from his role as President at Rochester College by September 2013.

He is known primarily as a preacher. Shelly has been involved in debates and academic lectures on Christian apologetics, ethics, and medical ethics. Shelly has also served with such groups as the AIDS Education Committee of the American Red Cross.

Changes in theological emphasis
Shelly's theological stance on several important issues abruptly shifted around 1986 from traditional Church of Christ theology. He began to voice a radical plea for Ecumenism, as indicated by his book, I Just Want to Be a Christian. Shelly had started out as a boy preacher in the Churches of Christ, writing several books containing what some have called "sound teaching", yet eventually Shelly became disenchanted with what he has called a "language of exclusion." "Out of my own spiritual evolution, I've tried to adopt a much more Christ-like spirit and not be so sectarian and isolationist", Shelly said.

Now, he pursues a unifying vision "more nearly the ideal of the early American Restoration Movement concept and experience than what [he] was born into." He critiques his former colleagues for trying to "decide who's in and who's out based on some list. We're very anticreedal in churches of Christ and Christian churches, meaning we won’t publish that list; we are more insidious in that we have unpublished lists of what lets you be "in" or "out" of our local churches. That's simply wrongheaded." Though these calls for unity do, in fact, echo Alexander Campbell and Barton W. Stone, in other ways Shelly has disengaged from the central tenet of the Restoration Movement: that the modern Church must restore the first century Church. In The Second Incarnation, Shelly and Randy Harris claim that this move is anachronistic and leads to doctrinal error, because no church has ever achieved perfection, and in any case, one cannot and should not attempt to recreate the first century Church.

Shelly has also co-edited and co-founded two important journals, Spiritual Sword in 1969 with Dr. Thomas B. Warren and Wineskins (more recently) with Mike Cope.

Leadership status
Rubel Shelly was inducted in 2007 into the Restoration Forum's Honor Roll of Unity, an award "given to people who are recognized for their love for those in the Christian fellowship and for their noble efforts to heal the divisions of the past and build unity."

Because Churches of Christ are strongly congregational, there are only a few ways to rise to prominence: publications, lectureships, holding the pulpit of a large congregation, and by outside recognition. Rubel Shelly has written many influential books, cited by others in the Restoration Movement, and he routinely appears at lectureships sponsored by Universities and colleges affiliated with the Church of Christ. Shelly has also been the preacher at one of the larger, more affluent churches for many years (Woodmont Hills Church in Nashville, Tennessee).

One measure of Shelly's national reputation is the fact that local and national journalists call on him as an expert about Church of Christ matters. An infamous example of this was when Nancy Grace of CNN asked Shelly on national television whether or not the Church of Christ is a cult. Many felt that Shelly did not have a chance to express himself fully. A text of the exchange can be found here:  Mike Cope was originally picked to be interviewed, as he is also one of the most prominent preachers in the Church of Christ .

Education
 B.A. Harding University
 M.A. Harding School of Theology
 M. Th. Harding School of Theology
 M.A. Vanderbilt University  
 Ph.D.Vanderbilt University

Publications
Books
Simple Study in Christian Evidences, Montgomery, Alabama: Bible & School Supply, 1970.
Living By the Rules: The Contemporary Value of the Ten Commandments, Nashville, Tennessee: 20th Century Christian, 1982. .
The Lamb and His Enemies: Understanding the Book of Revelation, Nashville, Tennessee: 20th Century Christian Foundation, 1983. .
I Just Want to Be a Christian, Revised Edition, Nashville, Tennessee: 20th Century Christian, 1986. .
Sing His Praise!: A Case for A Cappella Music as Worship Today, Nashville, Tennessee: 20th Century Christian, 1987. .
The Divine Folly: A Theology for Preaching the Gospel, Nashville, Tennessee: 20th Century Christian, 1990.
What Would Jesus Do Today?, with Mike Cope, West Monroe, Louisiana: Howard Books, 1998. .
Falling in Love with Jesus: Studies in the Book of Luke, Joplin, Missouri: College Press Publishing, 1998. .
Falling in Love with Jesus’ People: Studies in the Book of Acts, Joplin, Missouri: College Press Publishing, 1998. .
Starting Today: Stories and Scriptures for the Daily Grind, Nashville, Tennessee: B&H Publishing, 2001. .
The Names of Jesus, West Monroe, Louisiana: Howard Books, 2003. .
The Jesus Proposal: A Theological Framework for Maintaining the Unity of the Body of Christ. with John York, Siloam Springs, Arkansas: Leafwood Publishers, 2004. 
The Jesus Community, with John York, Siloam Springs, Arkansas: Leafwood Publishers, 2004. .
The Second Incarnation, with Randy Harris, Abilene, Texas: Leafwood Publishers, 2004. 
Divorce and Remarriage: A Redemptive Theology, Abilene, Texas: Leafwood Publishers, 2007. .
I Knew Jesus Before He Was a Christian and I liked Him Better Then, Abilene, Texas: Leafwood Publishers, 2011. .
Articles
"Loving the Person Who Isn't 'One of Us'" accessed 20 Dec, 2007.
"What's All the Fuss? Code Breaks Itself with Obvious Errors"

References

Bibliography 
"Dr. Rubel Shelly."  accessed 20 Dec. 2007.
"Rubel Shelly Inducted into Restoration Honor Roll: Religion professor Rubel Shelly was recently inducted into the Restoration Forum's Honor Roll of Unity." Oct. 2007.  accessed 20 December.
"Unity Celebration 2006."  accessed 20 Dec. 2007.
Edwards, Holly. "Rubel Shelly Leaving Church to Teach in Michigan College." The Tennessean. 02/01/05. Online edition. Accessed 11/19/07.  Edwards reviews Shelly's tenure at Woodmont Hills Church of Christ and announces his move to Rochester College.
Elliott, Raymond. "Book Review: The Jesus Proposal by Rubel Shelly & John O. York"  accessed 20 Dec. 2007.
Harper, Kevin. "Book Review: Divorce and Remarriage: A Redemptive Theology." 16 July 2007.  accessed 20 Dec. 2007. (A review of a recent book by Shelly)
Hughes, Richard T. Reviving the Ancient Faith: The Story of Churches of Christ in America. Abilene, Texas: Abilene Christian University Press, 1996. (Hughes' book charts Shelly's development from the Spiritual Sword days (328-29) to the shifts seen in the books I Just Want to Be a Christian and The Second Incarnation and finally to Wineskins (370-73).)

External links 

ZOE Group/New Wineskins Magazine
About us

Rochester University
Restoration Movement
Harding University alumni
Vanderbilt University alumni
Pepperdine University faculty
Tennessee State University faculty
Vanderbilt University faculty
Ministers of the Churches of Christ
American members of the Churches of Christ
Living people
Year of birth missing (living people)